Restless: The Best is a compilation album by German heavy metal band Accept, released in 1982. The songs are from 1980's I'm a Rebel, 1981's Breaker and 1982's Restless and Wild.

Track listing

Personnel
 Udo Dirkschneider – lead vocals (tracks 1–8, 10 & 11, 13–18)
 Wolf Hoffmann – guitar (all tracks)
 Jörg Fischer – guitar (tracks 2–4, 6–9, 12–16)
 Peter Baltes – bass guitar (all tracks), lead vocals (tracks 9 & 12), additional vocals (track 3)
 Stefan Kaufmann – drums (all tracks)
 Herman Frank – guitar (tracks 1, 5, 10, 11, 17 & 18)

References

1994 greatest hits albums
Accept (band) albums